The BP Super Show was an Australian television series of loosely scheduled TV specials often of the variety show genre (but not always), which aired from circa 1959 to circa 1970. The programs often featured international performers that were touring Australia. It originally aired on ATN-7 in Sydney and GTV-9 in Melbourne, with the production of episodes varying between the two stations, and it also aired on other stations across Australia (this was prior to the formation of the Seven Network and Nine Network). It aired on the Nine Network after the formation of that network. Given the varied nature of the episodes, critical reception varied, but was often very positive, with a 1961 episode with Ella Fitzgerald being called by The Age newspaper "one of the best shows of its type presented on Melbourne TV".

Episodes
Several episodes have been released on DVD by Umbrella Entertainment.

References

External links

1959 Australian television series debuts
1970 Australian television series endings
Australian variety television shows